Gnorismoneura maichau is a moth of the family Tortricidae. It is found in Vietnam.

The wingspan is 14 mm. The ground colour of the forewings is pale ochreous cream with weak suffusions. The markings and spots along the wing edges are brown. The hindwings are creamish and slightly sprinkled with brown and brown in the anal area which is limited by a brown fold.

Etymology
The name refers to the type locality, the Mai Châu District.

References

Moths described in 2008
Archipini
Moths of Asia
Taxa named by Józef Razowski